Sarangarh Lok Sabha constituency was a Lok Sabha (parliamentary) constituency in Chhattisgarh state in central India dissolved in 2008.

Assembly segments
Sarangarh Lok Sabha constituency comprised the following assembly segments:
 Saria
 Sarangarh
 Pamgarh
 Malkharoda
 Chandrapur
 Pallari
 Kasdol
 Bhatgaon

Members of Parliament

1952-76: Constituency does not exist
1977: Govindram Miri, Janata Party
1980: Paras Ram Bhardwaj, Indian National Congress
1984: Paras Ram Bhardwaj, Indian National Congress
1989: Paras Ram Bhardwaj, Indian National Congress
1991: Paras Ram Bhardwaj, Indian National Congress
1996: Paras Ram Bhardwaj, Indian National Congress
1998: Paras Ram Bhardwaj, Indian National Congress
1999: P.R. Khute, Bharatiya Janata Party
2004: Guharam Ajgalle, Bharatiya Janata Party
2008 Onwards: Constituency does not exist

See Korba (Lok Sabha constituency)

See also
 Raigarh district
 List of former constituencies of the Lok Sabha

References

Raigarh district
Former Lok Sabha constituencies of Madhya Pradesh
Former constituencies of the Lok Sabha
2008 disestablishments in India
Constituencies disestablished in 2008